"Supremacy" is a song by English rock band Muse. It was released on 20 February 2013 as the fourth single from their sixth studio album, The 2nd Law. "Supremacy" peaked at number 58 on the UK Singles Chart.

Composition
According to frontman Matthew Bellamy, "Supremacy" sees the band going to "absurd levels", while according to the French magazine Jeuxactu the song has elements of "Kashmir" from Led Zeppelin in its guitar riff and orchestration. The track has been compared to many James Bond theme songs.

Release
The song was first announced as the next single after "Follow Me", with a released date programmed for February 25, 2013. However, the song itself was not released with the album version, but with a live version, featuring a full orchestra and choir taken from the 2013 BRIT Awards performance on February 20, 2013, was released instead on iTunes the same night.

Music video
The music video was released on February 2, 2013 through the NME website. It features people with black metal corpse paint doing extreme sports like BMX and surfing while Muse plays the song.

Track listing

Charts

Release history

References

2013 singles
Muse (band) songs
Songs written by Matt Bellamy
2012 songs
Warner Records singles
British progressive rock songs